Fort Stansbury was a frontier outpost created during the Seminole War (1835—1842), and also used during the Civil War. The fort was located south of Tallahassee, Florida, and a few miles north of Wakulla Springs, inland from St. Marks, Florida. It was headquarters for the U.S. 3rd Infantry Regiment. Its construction would have been typical of other forts utilizing blockhouses and made from split pine trees. It was initially under the command of Lt. Colonel Ethan Allen Hitchcock from October 1842 until January 13, 1843.

References

External links
 "A Seminole War fort site in northern Florida"

Stansbury
Wakulla County, Florida
Pre-statehood history of Florida
Florida in the American Civil War
1842 establishments in Florida Territory